José Roque Paes (16 August 1933 – 21 June 1971), better known as Traçaia, was a Brazilian professional footballer who played as an attacking midfielder. He made five appearances for the Brazil national team in 1959. He was also part of Brazil's squad for the 1959 South American Championship that took place in Ecuador.

References

External links
 

1933 births
1971 deaths
People from Cuiabá
Brazilian footballers
Association football midfielders
Brazil international footballers
Campeonato Brasileiro Série A players
Campeonato Brasileiro Série B players
Austrian Football Bundesliga players
Cuiabá Esporte Clube players
Mixto Esporte Clube players
Sport Club do Recife players
FC Admira Wacker Mödling players
Kapfenberger SV players
Brazilian expatriate footballers
Brazilian expatriate sportspeople in Austria
Expatriate footballers in Austria
Sportspeople from Mato Grosso